John B. Goddard School of Business & Economics at Weber State University prepares students for careers in business and economics. The Goddard School attracts students from across the nation and around the world. More than 2,400 students are enrolled in undergraduate programs in accounting, business administration [with emphases in business administration, finance, management (with human resource management track), marketing, and supply chain management], economics, and information systems & technologies; and more than 360 students pursue degrees in the Master of Accounting program and the Master of Business Administration program. The school was named for John B. Goddard following his more than $6 million gift in 1998.

Graduate programs
The Goddard School's MBA is currently (2010) listed in the Princeton Review's 301 Best Business Schools.
 98 percent of the class of 2009 was placed within three months of graduation.
 The 2009 graduating class had mean starting compensation of approximately $65,000.

Undergraduate program
The following majors are offered:
 Accounting
 Business administration
 Business economics
 Economics
 Finance
 International business economics
 Marketing
 Management information systems
 Supply chain management

Notable alumni
 Jerry Moyes (B.S. business sdministration, 1966) – founder, CEO, and chairman of the board, Swift Transportation

See also
List of business schools in the United States

References

External links
 Official Goddard School Web Site

Business schools in Utah
Weber State University
Educational institutions established in 1966
University subdivisions in Utah
1966 establishments in Utah